Pyruvate dehydrogenase lipoamide kinase isozyme 3, mitochondrial is an enzyme that in humans is encoded by the PDK3 gene.
 It codes for an isozyme of pyruvate dehydrogenase kinase.The pyruvate dehydrogenase (PDH) complex is a nuclear-encoded mitochondrial multienzyme complex that catalyzes the overall conversion of pyruvate to acetyl-CoA and CO2. It provides the primary link between glycolysis and the tricarboxylic acid (TCA) cycle, and thus is one of the major enzymes responsible for the regulation of glucose metabolism. The enzymatic activity of PDH is regulated by a phosphorylation/dephosphorylation cycle, and phosphorylation results in inactivation of PDH. The protein encoded by this gene is one of the four pyruvate dehydrogenase kinases that inhibits the PDH complex by phosphorylation of the E1 alpha subunit. This gene is predominantly expressed in the heart and skeletal muscles. Alternatively spliced transcript variants encoding different isoforms have been found for this gene.

Structure
The structure of the PDK3/L2 complex has been elucidated, and there are several key features. When the L2 domain binds to PDK3, it induces a “cross-tail” conformation in PDK3, thereby stimulating activity. There are three crucial residues, Leu-140, Glu-170, and Glu-179, in the C-terminal domain that are crucial for this interaction. Structural studies have indicated that L2 binding stimulates activity by disrupting the closed conformation, or ATP lid, to remove product inhibition. The PDK3 subunits are in one of two conformations; one subunit exists as an “open” subunit, while the other subunit is “closed”. The open subunit is the configuration most crucial to the putative substrate-binding cleft, as it is where the target peptide can access the active center. The closed subunit blocks this target peptide because of a neighboring unwound alpha helix. Additionally, the ATP-binding loop in one PDK3 subunit adopts an open conformation, implying that the nucleotide loading into the active site is mediated by the inactive "pre-insertion" binding mode. This asymmetric complex represents a physiological state in which binding of a single L2-domain activates one of the PDHK subunits while inactivating another.
Thus, the L2-domains likely act not only as the structural anchors but also modulate the catalytic cycle of PDK3.

Function 
The Pyruvate Dehydrogenase (PDH) complex must be tightly regulated due to its central role in general metabolism. Within the complex, there are three serine residues on the E1 component that are sites for phosphorylation; this phosphorylation inactivates the complex. In humans, there have been four isozymes of Pyruvate Dehydrogenase Kinase that have been shown to phosphorylate these three sites: PDK1, PDK2, PDK3, and PDK4. The PDK3 protein is primarily found in the kidney, brain, and testis.

Regulation
As the primary regulators of a crucial step in the central metabolic pathway, the pyruvate dehydrogenase family is tightly regulated itself by a myriad of factors. 
PDK3, in conjunction with PDK2 and PDK4, are primary targets of peroxisome proliferator-activated receptor delta/beta (PPAR beta/delta), with PDK3 having five elements that respond to these receptors.

Model organisms 

Model organisms have been used in the study of PDK3 function. A conditional knockout mouse line called Pdk3tm2a(KOMP)Wtsi was generated at the Wellcome Trust Sanger Institute. Male and female animals underwent a standardized phenotypic screen to determine the effects of deletion. Additional screens performed:  - In-depth immunological phenotyping

References

Further reading 

 
 
 
 
 
 
 
 
 
 
 
 
 
 

EC 2.7.11